G.D. Searle, LLC is a wholly owned subsidiary of Pfizer. It is currently a trademark company and subsidiary of Pfizer, operating in more than 43 countries. It also operates as a distribution trademark for various pharmaceuticals that were developed by G. D. Searle & Company (often referred to as Searle). Searle is most notable for having developed the first female birth control pill, and the artificial sweetener NutraSweet. Searle also invented the drug Lomotil that enabled space travel by humans, and was the drug taken by Neil Armstrong to stop bowel movements prior to the Apollo Program. One of the notable Alumni of Searle is Donald Rumsfeld, the Secretary of State for Bush in the 2000s and the mastermind behind preemptive war. Prior to its 1985 merger with Monsanto, Searle was a company mainly focusing on life sciences, specifically pharmaceuticals, agriculture, and animal health.

History 

In , Gideon Daniel Searle founded Searle in Omaha, Nebraska. The company incorporated in 1908 and established headquarters in Skokie, Illinois in 1941.

Between 1977 and 1985, Donald Rumsfeld served as CEO, and then as president, of Searle. In 1985, he engineered the acquisition of Searle by Monsanto Corporation.

Starting in 1979, Robert B. Shapiro acted as general counsel for the firm, where developing Searle's aspartame product under the brand name NutraSweet. 

In 1993, a team of researchers at Searle Research and Development filed a patent application for celecoxib, which Searle developed and which became the first selective COX-2 inhibitor to be approved by the FDA on December 31, 1998.  Control of this blockbuster drug was often mentioned as a key reason for Pfizer's acquisition of Pharmacia.

In April 2000, Pharmacia Corporation was created by merging Pharmacia & Upjohn (which had come about as the result of an earlier merger of the companies Pharmacia and Upjohn) with Monsanto and its Searle unit. The merged company was based in Peapack, New Jersey.

In 2003, Pfizer acquired Pharmacia and retired the Searle name, while still in many Asian and European countries Searle persists under the same name, in various variants.

Products 
The company manufactures prescription drugs and nuclear medicine imaging equipment. Searle is known for its release of Enovid, the first commercial oral contraceptive, in 1960. It is also known for its release of the first bulk laxative, Metamucil, in 1934; Dramamine, for motion sickness; the COX-2 inhibitors Celebrex and Bextra; Ambien for insomnia; and NutraSweet (also known as aspartame), an artificial sweetener, in 1965. It was released in 1981 by FDA.

In 1996, the FDA removed all restrictions on the use of aspartame, which enabled its use in heated and baked goods.  G. D. Searle's patent on aspartame was extended in 1981 and ultimately expired in December 1992.

References

External links 
 
 The Pill

Biotechnology companies of the United States
Companies based in Skokie, Illinois
History of Chicago
Pharmaceutical companies of the United States
Pfizer
Pharmaceutical companies established in 1888
Health care companies based in New York (state)
1985 mergers and acquisitions
1888 establishments in Nebraska
American corporate subsidiaries